My Date with the President's Daughter is a 1998 American made-for-television romantic comedy film produced by Walt Disney Television and premiered as part of ABC's revival of The Wonderful World of Disney. It was shot in various locations around Toronto, Ontario, Canada. It was directed by Alex Zamm and starred Dabney Coleman, Will Friedle, and Elisabeth Harnois. It debuted on the ABC network on April 19, 1998. The film earned a small cult following among viewers who saw the original broadcast as well as its multiple reruns on the Disney Channel.

Plot 
Duncan Fletcher is an average teenager in search of a date to his school's spring dance due to a bet he makes with his friends, Larry and Arthur. At the mall, he meets a girl named Hallie, whom he does not recognize as the daughter of the President of the United States, George Richmond. Hallie is in the mall hiding from the Secret Service after sneaking off during her father's reelection campaign event. Duncan asks Hallie to the dance and she accepts, giving Duncan an address which he does not realize is the location of the White House.

The president initially refuses to let Hallie go out on the date due to a fundraiser that night, but he reluctantly complies after a brief discussion with his wife and first lady, Carol Richmond. Meanwhile, Duncan's family prepares to throw a house party for his father's company. As Duncan tells his family about his date, he asks his father Charles if he could borrow the company car, a red BMW 525i. His father declines, but Duncan takes the car anyway and goes to Hallie's to pick her up, arriving at the White House to his astonishment. Hallie has Duncan meet her father, who informs the young man that there are limitations on where they can and cannot go, and that the Secret Service will accompany the teens the entire time. Hallie insists she and Duncan are only going to dinner and a movie, but this turns out to be a cover so she and Duncan can sneak away from the Secret Service at a movie theater. Once the agents realize that they have lost Hallie and Duncan, the president is notified and he orders for Duncan's family to be brought to the fundraiser.

Having successfully shaken off the agents, Hallie and Duncan stop at a store called F/X to get some new clothes to wear on their date. After trying on multiple outfits, Hallie emerges from the dressing room in a sexy pink velour mini-dress. She then picks an outfit for Duncan—an expensive leather jacket. However, on the way to the dance, Hallie says she wants to briefly check out Club Alien, a newly opened night club. Duncan makes a phone call to his friends to tell them he’s not just bringing any date, but the President’s daughter herself, to the dance. Duncan insists to them he isn’t lying and increases the money for the bet.

During the house party at the Fletchers' residence, Mr. Fletcher realizes the company car is missing and tries to hide this from his boss, Herb. The family is then visited by the Secret Service, who inform them that Duncan has run away with the president's daughter and orders them to see the president at the fundraiser. The agents also inform them that Duncan and Hallie were last seen driving a red BMW, which Herb overhears and chastises Charles for.

While Hallie drives to Club Alien in Duncan's vehicle, they stop at a red light and encounter trouble with a truck of rednecks who make crass comments at Hallie, much to her annoyance. Hallie warns the men to back off, as she believes that Duncan would defend her from them, which prompts one of the men to threaten Duncan. In a panic, Duncan urges Hallie to run the red light, and she accidentally treads over the man's foot while doing so.

The pair encounter many more obstacles through the night—including a run-in at a biker bar and the theft of Mr. Fletcher's car by a crazed couple—that prevent them from getting to the dance and Duncan winning his bet. Mr. Fletcher and President Richmond team up to search for the pair through the city. The two men get arrested for a traffic violation when a traffic cop fails to recognize the President, but they are later released to their families. Hallie learns about the bet Duncan made and angrily ditches him for Duncan's rival, Steve Ellinger. At Steve's house, Steve begins making unwanted advances on an uncomfortable Hallie. Duncan finds Steve's house, and after a fight, manages to rescue Hallie. Duncan apologizes to Hallie and the couple shares a kiss on the Lincoln Memorial steps as the sun rises. Hallie returns home safely, but both she and Duncan realize they might have feelings for each other.

Though he did not make it to the dance and thus lost the bet, Duncan feels satisfied with the outcome and does not care if his friends doubt his account of the events. Mr. Fletcher goes easy on his son until he learns that Duncan used his credit card to pay for the outfits from F/X. President Richmond arrives at Duncan's school to thank him for Hallie's date and allows Duncan to continue seeing his daughter. As a result, Duncan's reputation at school improves from his average status, and Duncan's father is promoted at work after his boss is allowed to meet the President and play golf with him. Hallie and Duncan are able to pursue a real relationship and happily go on a second date, flanked by the Secret Service SUVs and Marine One.

Cast

Soundtrack
The film featured the song "My Date with the President's Daughter" by the band the Presidents of the United States of America, describing events similar to those in the plot. The film also features the jazz song "Moonlight Magic" performed by Alan Moorhouse.

Accolades 
In 1999, Alex Zamm and William Robertson were nominated for a Writers Guild of America Award in the category of Children’s Script.

References

External links

1998 films
1990s English-language films
1998 television films
1998 romantic comedy films
American teen comedy films
American teen romance films
Films about fictional presidents of the United States
Films directed by Alex Zamm
Disney television films
Films set in Washington, D.C.
Films shot in Toronto
Films set in the White House
1990s American films
ABC network original films